Clintonia udensis is a species of flowering plant in the lily family Liliaceae. It is the only species of Clintonia native to Asia. It prefers sparsely forested habitat including the alpine forests of the Himalayas.

Description

Clintonia udensis is a perennial herbaceous plant that spreads by means of underground rhizomes, forming colonies on the floors of temperate forests. The leaf margins are pubescent when young. The inflorescence is 3--12-flowered, in short terminal racemes with densely pubescent pedicels.

Taxonomy

Clintonia udensis was first described by Ernst Rudolf von Trautvetter and Carl Anton von Meyer in 1856. The specific epithet udensis, which means "from the River Uda or the Uden district of Siberia", evidently refers to a region in the Russian Far East where the plant is known to occur.
 
, Plants of the World Online accepts the following infraspecific names:

 Clintonia udensis var. alpina (Kunth ex Baker) H.Hara
 Clintonia udensis var. udensis

The word alpina means "of upland or mountainous regions". Indeed, members of C. u. var. alpina are exclusively found above  in the Himalayas.

Some authorities do not accept the above infraspecific names. The claim is that there are no morphological characters that consistently separate the two varieties.

Distribution

Clintonia udensis is wide-ranging, from the Russian Far East to southeast Asia, extending east-west from the Kuril Islands in the Pacific Ocean to the Western Himalaya region.

 Bhutan
 China: Gansu, Hebei, Heilongjiang, Henan, Hubei, Jilin, Liaoning, Shaanxi, Shanxi, Sichuan, Tibet Autonomous Region (Xizang), Yunnan
 India: Assam, Sikkim, Uttarakhand
 Japan
 Korea
 Myanmar (Burma)
 Nepal
 Russia: Amur Oblast, Khabarovsk Krai, Kuril Islands, Primorsky Krai, Sakhalin

C. u. var. alpina is found in the Himalayas (from Uttarakhand to Bhutan), Assam, northern Myanmar, and western China.

Bibliography

References

External links

 

udensis
Flora of China
Flora of Russia
Flora of Japan
Flora of Korea
Flora of the Indian subcontinent
Flora of Myanmar
Plants described in 1856